Nepa apiculata is a species of waterscorpion in the family Nepidae. It is found in eastern North America (Canada and United States).

References

Nepidae
Articles created by Qbugbot
Insects described in 1862